Cameron Williamson (born 26 March 1970) is an Australian cricketer. He played in two first-class matches for South Australia between 1990 and 1992.

See also
 List of South Australian representative cricketers

References

External links
 

1970 births
Living people
Australian cricketers
South Australia cricketers
Cricketers from Sydney